Sphallotrichus sculpticollis is a species of beetle in the family Cerambycidae. It was described by Buquet in 1852. It is known from Colombia.

References

Cerambycini
Beetles described in 1852